The 1951 Houston Cougars football team was an American football team that represented the University of Houston in the Missouri Valley Conference (MVC) during the 1951 college football season. In its fourth season under head coach Clyde Lee, the team compiled a 6–5 record, finished fourth in the MVC, and defeated Dayton in the 1952 Salad Bowl. Gene Shannon, John O'Hara, and Buck Miller were the team captains. The team played its home games at Rice Stadium in Houston.

Schedule

References

Houston
Houston Cougars football seasons
Salad Bowl champion seasons
Houston Cougars football